Keith Roy Macdonald (13 May 1933 – 20 September 2021) was a Scottish rugby union player who played for the Barbarians and represented the national team.

He attended the High School of Dundee.

Macdonald died on 20 September 2021, at the age of 88, in Elie, Fife.

References

1933 births
2021 deaths
People educated at the High School of Dundee
Barbarian F.C. players
Scottish rugby union players
Scotland international rugby union players